The Indian Academy of Sciences, Bangalore was founded by Indian Physicist and Nobel Laureate C. V. Raman, and was registered as a society on 24 April 1934. Inaugurated on 31 July 1934, it began with 65 founding fellows. The first general meeting of Fellows, held on the same day, elected Raman as president, and adopted the constitution of the Academy.

Objectives 
The aims of the Academy are to:

 Promote progress in pure and applied branches of science.
 Encourage important research in various branches of science.
 Represent the scientific work of India internationally.
 Publish work relating to scientific research initiated by the Academy, Provincial Academies, Universities and Government Scientific Institutions.
 Organise meetings of Committees and Conferences to discuss papers submitted to the Academy.
 Advise Government and other bodies on scientific and other matters referred to the Academy.

Publications 
The first issue of the Academy Proceedings appeared in two sections in July 1934. They were split into two in July 1935 - one part devoted to physical sciences and the other to life sciences. In 1973 the Academy's publications were further split into several journals aimed as specific scientific disciplines.

The Academy publishes a monthly journal called Resonance since January 1996. Aimed generally at undergraduates, it also contains some material for junior and senior academic levels. Each issue focuses on the life and work of a famous scientist. It incorporates articles reviewing new books and classics. The Editorial Board comprises 40 scientists from across the country.

The Academy also publishes a monthly research journal called Sadhana - Academy Proceedings in Engineering Sciences since 1978. The journal covers all branches of Engineering Science. Sadhana is distributed in print outside India and online worldwide by Springer.

The Academy publishes 12 Journal, viz., Resonance – Journal of Science Education, Journal of Biosciences, Journal of Astrophysics and Astronomy, Journal of Genetics, Journal of Earth System and Science, Sadhana – Academy Proceedings in Engineering Sciences, Pramana – Journal of Physics, Proceedings of Mathematical Sciences, Journal of Chemical Sciences, Bulletin of Material Science, DIALOGUE: Science, Scientists, and Society, and Indian Academy of Sciences Conference Series.

Project Lifescape 
Aimed at enriching scientific education, the Academy launched Project Lifescape in collaboration with the Centre for Ecological Sciences at the Indian Institute of Science to spread biodiversity literacy. It aims to involve school and college students in obtaining first-hand information on the status of, and ongoing changes in, ecological habitats of a set of species of considerable human significance. An objective of the project is to publish illustrated accounts of 1500 Indian species of micro-organisms, plants and animals. The accounts would also include ancillary information on the distribution, ecology and behaviour of the species.

The project has published three books, Butterflies of Peninsular India, Freshwater Fishes of Peninsular India, and Amphibians of Peninsular India. A fourth, Dragonflies and Damselflies of Peninsular India is available in electronic format, freely downloadable from the project website.

The Raman Chair 
The Government of India instituted the Raman Chair in 1972 to commemorate the memory of the founder of the Academy. Eminent scientists are invited by the Council of the Academy to occupy the Chair, for periods of between six weeks and six months.

Science education activities 
The Academy sponsors and conducts two-week Refresher Courses for selected teachers from across India. It awards annual Summer Research Fellowships to talented teachers and students to work with Academy Fellows on research-oriented projects in various research centres across India. It conducts Lecture Programmes at schools and universities on various research topics.

Members of the council 
Umesh V Waghmare (President)
Partha P Majumder (Previous President)
Manindra Agrawal (Vice-President)
Bapat, Sharmila
Gautam Biswas
Renee Borges (Secretary)
Mihir Kanti Chaudhuri (Vice-President)
Rohini Godbole
Jayaram, Vikram
V. Nagaraja
Kapil Hari Paranjape
Radhakrishnan, T P
Mythily Ramaswamy
Srivastava, D C
Nikhil Tandon
Sampat Kumar Tandon (Vice-President)
Raghavan Varadarajan (Vice-President)

Presidents 
The list of presidents of the academy.

See also 
 National Academy of Sciences, India
 Indian National Science Academy

References

External links 
The Indian Academy of Sciences website
Resonance Journal website
World Wide Science website

National academies
National academies of sciences
1934 establishments in India
Organisations based in Bangalore
Research institutes in Bangalore
Scientific organizations established in 1934